Demopolis Army Airfield is a former United States Army facility located six nautical miles (7 mi, 11 km) southwest of the central business district of Demopolis, a city in Marengo County, Alabama, United States.

History
During World War II the airfield was built by the United States Army Air Forces and opened in October 1943.  It was assigned to  Third Air Force. It was used to train pilots as an axillary airfield to the group and replacement training center at Key Field, Mississippi. With the end of the war in September 1945, activities at Demopolis Army Airfield were diminished. The airfield was returned to civil control in 1946 and is now known as Demopolis Municipal Airport.

See also

 Alabama World War II Army Airfields
 List of airports in Alabama

References 

1943 establishments in Alabama
Airports established in 1943
Airfields of the United States Army Air Forces in Alabama
Transportation buildings and structures in Marengo County, Alabama
Closed installations of the United States Army